Maude Kellerman Swingle (1888-1992) was an American botanist who co-authored works with her husband the botanist Walter Tennyson Swingle.  She was educated at the Ohio State University and worked as a librarian at the United States Department of Agriculture.

References 

1888 births
1992 deaths
American women scientists
American botanists
Ohio State University alumni